The 1990 Denmark Open in badminton was a three-star tournament held in Aabenraa, from October 24 to October 28, 1990.

Final results

References

Denmark Open
Denmark